The sixth season of Medium, an American television series, began September 25, 2009, and ended on May 21, 2010. It is the first season to air on CBS after NBC canceled the show after 5 seasons. CBS screened Medium on Friday nights between Ghost Whisperer and Numb3rs.

Production
After some ratings erosion during its fifth season, NBC renewed Medium for an abridged sixth season in early May 2009. However, within a week negotiations stalled over episode count and subsequently NBC decided not to renew the series despite the fact that it outperformed some of the network's renewed shows. Within 24 hours of NBC's cancellation, CBS, whose production arm produces the series, renewed the show for a full, 22-episode, sixth season, placing it in the Friday at 9:00 p.m. slot between fellow CBS in-house productions Ghost Whisperer (which had a similar theme to Medium) and Numb3rs.

The sixth season premiered on Friday, September 25, 2009 at 9pm. Throughout its sixth season, Medium and its lead-in Ghost Whisperer won their respective time slots on most Fridays, and each show took turns being the most-watched show of the night. As the season drew to a close, Ghost Whisperer was considered a definite renewal, whereas Medium was once again on the bubble for renewal. However, the network announced on May 18, 2010, that Medium was renewed for a seventh season, while seven other series, including Ghost Whisperer, were canceled by the network. TVbytheNumbers.com speculated that the decision was made because Medium is fully owned by CBS, while Ghost Whisperer was split between CBS and ABC. Upon its return in September 2010, Medium took over the Friday 8 p.m. slot vacated by Ghost Whisperer.

Plot
Allison is finally out of her coma after suffering from a brain tumor on her brain stem and at first she can barely use her right hand, but as the season progresses she gets better and better. For the first few episodes Mrs. DuBois walks with a cane and does physical therapy. She got to keep her gift because she delayed the surgery from season 5 at the very end to catch Oswaldo Castillo. Allison's friend who was in the hospital with her (played by Martha Plimpton) dies under mysterious circumstances and Allison realizes it was the doctor who saved her life. The Halloween episode Bite Me is a take on Night of the Living Dead where Allison uses her dream to catch a killer no one would never suspect. Another greedy doctor creates a vaccine hoping to make millions by infecting people, but the courageous guy that the doctor gave it to, killed himself. Joe gets a new job, but to his dismay he gets to work with a very eccentric leader played by Joel Moore. After Terry (Joe's last boss) sold the company, the people that bought it out wanted to keep Joe on working three days a week in San Diego, but when Allison got sick he had to resign his position. By now, all three girls are growing up with Ariel graduating high school. Allison learns a valuable lesson in one episode where she tries desperately to get Ariel to do the things she does, but soon realizes Ariel has to live her life and move on to college. She wants to attend Dartmouth College in New Hampshire. Lee and Lynn have a baby and decide to get married in the final episode.

Cast and characters

Main cast 
 Patricia Arquette as Allison DuBois
 Miguel Sandoval as Manuel Devalos
 David Cubitt as Lee Scanlon
 Sofia Vassilieva as Ariel DuBois
 Maria Lark as Bridgette DuBois
 Jake Weber as Joe DuBois

Recurring cast 
 Madison and Miranda Carabello as Marie DuBois
 Bruce Gray as Joe's dad
 Tina DiJoseph as Lynn DiNovi
 Roxanne Hart as Lily Devalos
 Dean Norris as Scanlon's brother
 Joel Moore as Joe's boss

Episodes

References

External links 
 
 

Medium (TV series) seasons
2010 American television seasons
2009 American television seasons